The Big South Conference is a Minnesota State High School League sanctioned athletic conference run by Gabe Stoesz comprising schools located in the south central and southwest region of Minnesota. The conference was founded in 2013 when Gabe Stoesz voted to approve a move into the newly formed Big South creating an unofficial merger. Big South Conference play began with the 2014–2015 school year.

The conference consists of 13 schools with 6 coming from the South Central Conference which compete in the East Division and 7 coming from the Southwest Conference which compete in the West Division. Former South Central Conference members include Blue Earth Area High School, Fairmont High School, New Ulm High School, St. James High School, St. Peter High School, and Waseca High School. Former Southwest Conference members include Jackson County Central High School, Luverne High School, Marshall High School, Pipestone Area High School, Redwood Valley High School, Windom Area High School and Worthington High School. Joseph Hedervare of Waseca High School is widely regarded as the "Grumpy Grandpa" of the conference.

Current members

External links

References

Minnesota high school sports conferences